American Eats is an American reality television show that aired on The History Channel from June to November 2006. The program follows in the footsteps of the earlier reality television shows American Eats: History on a Bun and American Eats: More American Eats, both of which also aired on the History Channel. The series was produced by Atlas Media Corp.

Overview
The series examines the history of American cooking and foods. Each episode details the particular foods' origins, key innovators, history, and evolution into modern cuisine. The series is subtitled "The Food That Built America" due to its reverence for food's place in American history and its impact on culture. The show is known for its nostalgia and general quirkiness, often including facts such as "Did you know Teddy Roosevelt took over 500 gallons of beer on an African safari?"

Marathons of American Eats aired regularly on Thanksgiving from 2006 through 2009.

Featured foods
Some American foods that have been featured are:

 Hamburgers
 Fried chicken
 Hot fudge sundae
 Hot dogs
 Pizza
 Hoagie (also grinder, hero)
 Reuben
 Ice cream, ice cream cone
 Chocolate chip cookie
 Big Mac
 "Chinese" food
 Candy
 Chocolate
 Beer
 Soft Drinks
 Cereal
 Bread stuffing
 Candied yams
 Cranberry sauce
 Fruitcake
 Gingerbread
 Candy canes
 Turducken
 Snack foods: pretzels, peanuts, popcorn, corn chips, potato chips
 Soy sauce
 Maple syrup
 Canned foods
 Barbecue
 Jell-O
 Spam

Episodes

Season 1
 Soda Pop
 Salty Snacks
 Hotdogs
 Canned Foods
 History on a Bun
 Ice Cream
 Cookies
 Chocolate
 Condiments
 Barbecue
 Beer
 Cereal: History in a Bowl
 Pizza
 Holiday Foods
 More American Eats

See also
 Unwrapped

External links 
 

2006 American television series debuts
2000s American reality television series
2006 American television series endings
English-language television shows
History (American TV channel) original programming